The Entente Florale Europe ("Flowery Alliance of Europe") is an international horticultural competition established to recognise municipalities and villages in Europe for excellence in horticultural displays. Trophies are presented annually by tourist boards and horticultural societies of European countries. There are three categories:

"Cities" (population over 30,000)
"Town" (population of 5,000–30,000)
"Village" (population of less than 5,000).

History
Entente Florale Europe is a competition for Towns and Villages. The competition name puns on the Entente Cordiale ("Friendly Understanding", 1904). Each participating country puts forward a representative Town and Village. The Town and Village are visited by the Jury and an assessment is made. The competition was founded in 1975, initially between Great Britain and France. At present there are eleven member countries and further applications are being processed.

 
In 1996, an international non profit association (AISBL) was founded under the name of Association Européenne pour le Fleurissement et le Paysage (European Association for Blooming and the Countryside), with the responsibility of the overall organisation of the competition and to obtain support from official bodies in the different countries. The AEFP is incorporated under the Belgian Law of 8 September 1997, and the Statutes were published in the Belgian Monitor on 8 September 1998. The amended articles, by Law of 2 May 2002 were published in the Belgian Monitor on 28 April 2006.

Since 1998 under the aegis of the 'Association Européenne pour le Fleurissement et le Paysage', the association and the competition Entente Florale Europe are open to all countries in the European Union as well as to the EFTA members countries (European Free Trade Association).

The competition has enjoyed the support of the International Association of Horticulture producers (AIPH) since its inception. In individual countries the competition is supported and organised by Ministries/Department of Agriculture, Tourism, as well as horticultural bodies and associations.

The President represents the association and is acting for 2 years. Each successive President shall be from a different country per alphabetic order.

Participation
Who can Enter ?

The competition is open to all countries in the EU and in the EFTA subject to approval by the board of AEFP. There are three categories, every member country can put forward 2 entries from two different categories.
 Cities/Towns (population over 30,000)
 Towns (population between 5,000 and 30,000)
 Villages (population below 5,000)

How & When to Enter ?

 Applications are made by the national organisation in charge of the competition.
 New members are elected by the Board of Directors of the AEFP, by simple majority, at its twice yearly meetings (March & September).
 Notification of entrants from existing members should reach the Secretariat before December 31 of the year prior to adjudication.

Organisation
Who organises the Competition?

Overall organisations is by the "Association Européenne du Fleurissement et du Paysage" (A.E.F.P.).
AEFP is a non-profit organization, incorporated under Belgian Law(s). Each participant country has its own organisation and is entitled to membership on the Board of Directors of the AEFP. The competition has enjoyed the support of the International Association of Horticultural Producers (AIPH) since its inception.
In individual countries the competition is supported and organised by Ministries/Departments of Agriculture, Environment, Tourism as well as horticultural bodies and associations.

The Aim of the Competition

The overall aim of the competition is the improvement of the quality of life for local urban and village communities. To this end the competition fosters:
 The greening of towns and villages
 Flowers, shrubs, green spaces, parks
 Development which is environmentally and ecologically sensitive
 Educational and communication initiatives which promote environmental awareness.

Advantages of Joining

You will
 Enhance the reputation of your town, village, country
 Facilitate contacts of a tourist, cultural nature
 Improve the appearance and fabric of your towns and villages
 Foster community spirit and enhance the quality of life
 Enable citizens to assume ownership of their local environment

Jury members in 2015
Austria (AT)
 Martin Wagner, Horticultural engineer; Vice-chair of the jury
 Johanna Renat, Spatial planner
Belgium (BE)
 Rudi Geerardyn, Landscape architect & Town planner; Chair of the jury
Czech Republic (CZ)
 Inka Truxova, Landscape architect
 Petr Šiřina, Landscape architect
 Jaroslav Brzak, Landscape architect
Germany (DE)
 Dr. Rüdiger Kirsten, Landscape architect & Town planner; Vice-chair of the jury
 Hildegunde Franziska Henrich, Landscape architect & Town planner
Hungary (HU)
 Dr. Andrea BOCSI, Tourism expert & Economist
 Dr. Ildikó Réka Báthoryné Nagy, Landscape architect
 Szilvia Halász Spanyárné, Landscape architect
Ireland (IE)
 Eamonn De Stafort, Tourism consultant
 Dr. Christy Boylan, Horticulturist & Landscape architect
Italy (IT)
 Anna Furlani Pedoja, Landscape architect
 Jacopo Fontaneto, Agriculture and Green Journalist, Tourism consultant
 Mauro Paradisi, Municipal urban designer
Netherlands (NL)
 Nico Anthony Brink  Landscape architect
 Marjolijn Ruijs, Landscape contractor
Slovenia (SI)
 Anton Schlaus, Architect & Consultant for energy efficient building
 Martina Schlaus, Architect & Conservator for Cultural Heritage
United Kingdom (UK)
 Peter Holman, Horticultural & Greenspace Consultant
 David Littlewood, Horticulturist
 Mark WASILEWSKI, Park Management

Previous winners
Note re UK representatives -

Towns/Cities

Villages

Notes
Note 1 - in some cases the overall winner from the UK is not named in "Britain in Bloom" by Graham Ashworth as an Entente Florale Representative (namely Bath in 1975 and Pateley Bridge in 1978).
Note 2 - Luxembourg competed between years 1980 - 1988.
Note 3 - Switzerland competed between years 1984 - 1986.
Note 4 - Portugal competed in year 1991 and between years 1994 - 2000.
Note 5 - Canada competed between years 1992 - 1993.

References

External links
 www.entente-florale.eu
Sheffield City Council - Entente Florale
Kilkenny City Entente Florale Website -Kilkenny is Ireland's 2006 Entry to the Entente Florale

Links of participating nations homepages
Austria
Belgium
Croatia
Czech Republic
France
Germany
Hungary
Ireland
Italy
Netherlands
Slovenija  	
United Kingdom

Other Language Wikipedias
Concours des villes et villages fleuris - French National Competition article

Horticultural exhibitions
Horticultural competitions